Stefan Reuter (born 16 October 1966) is a German football executive and former player who played as a defender or midfielder. He is the general manager of Bundesliga club FC Augsburg.

During his playing career, he was included in the West Germany national team which won the 1990 FIFA World Cup and the Germany which won UEFA Euro 1996. He also won the 1996–97 UEFA Champions League with Borussia Dortmund.

Club career
Born in Dinkelsbühl, Reuter started his career with local side TSV 1860 Dinkelsbühl. In 1982, he played for 1. FC Nürnberg, first in the 2. Bundesliga and, from 1985, in the Bundesliga. In exactly 100 games he scored ten goals. He was occasionally used as a right sided midfielder.

In 1988, he was transferred to Bayern Munich. He played 95 games in the Bundesliga and scored four goals for the Bavarians. He won the Bundesliga title with Bayern in 1988–89 and 1989–90.

A proposed move to Liverpool following West Germany's victorious World Cup campaign was turned down at the last minute with Reuter following many of his compatriots to Italy.  From 1991 to 1992 he played for Juventus, but soon returned to Germany, joining Borussia Dortmund. With Borussia, Reuter won the Bundesliga in 1994–95, 1995–96 and 2001–02, and the UEFA Champions League in 1996–97. The team also reached the final of the UEFA Cup in both 1993 and 2002. Overall, he played 307 games for Dortmund and scored 11 goals in the Bundesliga before retiring in 2004.

All in all it were 69 games (two goals) for Nürnberg (nine), Bayern Munich (18), Juventus (18) and Borussia Dortmund (33).

International career
In 1984, Reuter was part of the team that won the U-16 European Championship. He later won the 1990 World Cup, as well as the Euro 1996. At Euro 1996 he scored one of the penalties in the semi-final shootout against England, however like Andreas Möller he was suspended for the final.

In 1992, Reuter became the first player in the European Championship history to be substituted as a substitute, when during the match between Germany and Scotland, he replaced Karl-Heinz Riedle but then only seven minutes later he had to leave the field due to an injury, and was replaced by Michael Schulz.

He was known for his speed on the field; as a sprinter in his youth he ran the 100 metres in 10.8 seconds, a quality that resulted in his nickname "Turbo".

Managerial career
Reuter served as team manager for TSV 1860 München from January 2006 to 2 February 2009 when he was removed from the job.

On 27 February 2012, he was appointed as general manager of FC Augsburg.

Club statistics

Honours
Borussia Dortmund
 Bundesliga: 1994–95, 1995–96, 2001–02
 DFL-Supercup: 1995, 1996
 UEFA Champions League: 1996–97
 UEFA Cup: runner-up: 1992–93, 2001–02
 Intercontinental Cup: 1997

Bayern Munich
 Bundesliga: 1988–89, 1989–90
 DFL-Supercup: 1990

Juventus
 Serie A: runner-up: 1991–92
 Coppa Italia: runner-up: 1991–92

West Germany, Germany
 FIFA World Cup: 1990
 European Championship: 1996, runner-up 1992

Germany U16
 UEFA European Under-16 Championship: 1984

References

1966 births
Living people
German expatriate footballers
German footballers
Germany international footballers
Germany under-21 international footballers
Association football midfielders
Association football defenders
German football managers
Borussia Dortmund players
FC Bayern Munich footballers
Juventus F.C. players
Serie A players
Expatriate footballers in Italy
1. FC Nürnberg players
1990 FIFA World Cup players
UEFA Euro 1992 players
UEFA Euro 1996 players
1998 FIFA World Cup players
FIFA World Cup-winning players
UEFA European Championship-winning players
Bundesliga players
2. Bundesliga players
German expatriate sportspeople in Italy
UEFA Champions League winning players
Footballers from Bavaria
West German footballers